Pacific Islands University (PIU) is a private Christian university in Mangilao, Guam. Founded in 1976, the university offers Associate in Arts and Bachelor of Arts degrees in Bible and Liberal Arts.

Administration
The board of directors for Pacific Islands Bible College represents the Liebenzell Mission International, Palau Evangelical Church, and Yap Evangelical Church. The faculty and staff consist of islanders, as well as missionaries from Germany and the United States.

References

Educational institutions established in 1976
Bible colleges
Universities and colleges in Guam
Colleges in the Federated States of Micronesia
Colleges in Palau
Transnational Association of Christian Colleges and Schools
1976 establishments in Guam